Kovilpatti taluk is a taluk of Thoothukudi district of the Indian state of Tamil Nadu. The headquarters of the taluk is the town of Kovilpatti.

Demographics
According to the 2011 census, the taluk of Kovilpatti had a population of 312,825 with 153,425 males and 159,400 females. There were 1039 women for every 1000 men. The taluk had a literacy rate of 74.59%. Child population in the age group below 6 years were 13,741 Males and 13,592 Females.

References 

Taluks of Thoothukudi district